Acanthepeira stellata, known generally as the starbellied orbweaver or starbellied spider, is a species of orb weaver in the spider family Araneidae. It is found in a range from Canada to Mexico. It is most commonly found along the Eastern and Western coastline of North America.

Description

The abdomen of the starbellied orbweaver is covered with several spikes that have inspired its name. Like other orb weaver spiders, it is nocturnal and creates vertical webs to catch flying insects.

References

External links

 
 https://usaspiders.com/acanthepeira-stellata-starbellied-orb-weaver/

Araneidae
Articles created by Qbugbot
Spiders described in 1805